Downton Creek is a stream in the West-Central Interior of British Columbia, Canada that flows from Mount Downton in the Itcha Range due southeast to the Chilcotin River.

References

Rivers of the Chilcotin
Itcha Range